Javier Carbayeda (born 5 October 1966) is a Spanish former cyclist. He competed in the team time trial at the 1988 Summer Olympics.

References

External links
 

1966 births
Living people
Spanish male cyclists
Olympic cyclists of Spain
Cyclists at the 1988 Summer Olympics
People from Usurbil
Sportspeople from Gipuzkoa
Cyclists from the Basque Country (autonomous community)